The 1980 NAIA World Series was the 24th annual tournament hosted by the National Association of Intercollegiate Athletics to determine the national champion of baseball among its member colleges and universities in the United States and Canada.

The tournament was played at Herschel Greer Stadium in Nashville, Tennessee.

Grand Canyon (56-14-2) defeated Lewis (IL) (61–24) in a single-game championship series, 5–4, to win the Antelopes' first NAIA World Series.

Grand Canyon pitcher Jim Gerlach was named tournament MVP.

Bracket

See also
 1980 NCAA Division I baseball tournament
 1980 NCAA Division II baseball tournament
 1980 NCAA Division III baseball tournament

Reference

|NAIA World Series
NAIA World Series
NAIA World Series
NAIA World Series